This is the discography of Irish singer Johnny Logan.

Albums

Studio albums

Compilation albums

Singles

References

Discographies of Irish artists
Pop music discographies